The Talmberk family ( or ) was a Bohemian noble house.

History
The Talmberk family was founded at the end of the 13th century. The first known member is William of Talmberk, a descendant of Hroznata of Úžice who was first mentioned in 1297.

The family came under the ownership of Jankov in 1418. They remained in possession of the village until 1702, when it was sold.

The  remained in the family from the 16th century until the death of the last member.

At the end of the 16th century, the family had split into separate branches. The last male member of the family died in 1735.

Coat of arms

Two silver water lilies on a shield of red, each with a large leaf bent inwards towards one another. Helmet with silver and red mantling with red vol.

Notable members
Hroznata of Úžice, brother-in-law of Zavis of Falkenstein, founder of the Talmberk family 
Vilém of Talmberk, son or nephew of Hroznata of Úžice, the first member of the family by name 
Arnošt of Talmberk, son of Hroznata of Úžice, founder of the 
Diviš of Talmberk (died 1415), burgrave of Prague Castle
Oldřich of Talmberk, son of Diviš of Talmberk, inherited Talmberk in 1415 after his father's death
 (died 2 May 1450), bishop of the Roman Catholic Archdiocese of Olomouc
 (before 1460 - 1498), Czech nobleman, priest, and member of the Canons Regular of the Holy Sepulchre
  (mid-16th century - 13 October 1643), Czech politician and 
 (31 December 1644 - 3 April 1698), bishop of the Roman Catholic Diocese of Hradec Králové
Rudolf Franz Ferdinand von Talmberg ( 1645–1702), artist, chamberlain, and cavalry captain in the court of Leopold I, Holy Roman Emperor

References

Bohemian noble families